The following is a list of the exports of Afghanistan.

Data is for 2019, in millions of United States dollars, as reported by the International Trade Centre. Currently the top fifteen exports are listed.

References

Exports
Afghanistan
Foreign relations of Afghanistan